The Pixel 4a and Pixel 4a (5G) are a pair of Android smartphones designed, developed, and marketed by Google as part of the Google Pixel product line. They collectively serve as mid-range variants of the Pixel 4 and Pixel 4 XL. The Pixel 4a was announced on August 3, 2020 via a press release, while the Pixel 4a (5G) was announced on September 30, 2020 at the "Launch Night In" event.

Specifications

Design and hardware 

The Pixel 4a and 4a (5G) resemble the Pixel 4, but have a polycarbonate unibody construction and Gorilla Glass 3 for the screen. Both devices are available in 'Just Black'. 'Clearly White' is exclusive to the Pixel 4a (5G), only on Verizon with millimeter-wave (mmWave) support at launch. A limited edition 'Barely Blue' color for the Pixel 4a was later added to the Google Store. The back houses a capacitive fingerprint sensor centered below the camera lens. Both have stereo loudspeakers, one located on the bottom edge and the other doubling as the earpiece, and a 3.5mm headphone jack. A USB-C port is used for charging and connecting other accessories.

The Pixel 4a is powered by the Qualcomm Snapdragon 730G system-on-chip / Adreno 618 GPU, while the Pixel 4a (5G) is powered by the Qualcomm Snapdragon 765G system-on-chip / Adreno 620 GPU. Both have 6GB of RAM, with 128GB of non-expandable internal storage. They lack wireless charging, water resistance, Active Edge and the Pixel Neural Core (PNC), all of which are standard on the Pixel 4. The battery capacity is 3140 mAh for the Pixel 4a and 3885 mAh for the Pixel 4a (5G); fast charging is supported at up to 18 W (USB Power Delivery, using in-box adapter).

The Pixel 4a and Pixel 4a (5G) feature a 1080p OLED display with HDR support measuring 5.8-inches and 6.2-inches respectively. The display has slim uniform bezels, and a circular cutout in the upper left hand corner for the front-facing camera, with a 19.5:9 aspect ratio.

The Pixel 4a and Pixel 4a (5G) have a raised square module housing the camera. The Pixel 4a has a single rear-facing camera, with the same 12.2-megapixel sensor found on the Pixel 4; the Pixel 4a (5G) adds a secondary 16-megapixel ultrawide sensor. The front-facing camera has an 8-megapixel sensor. Both phones can record video at 4K resolution; the Pixel 4a is limited to 30 fps, and the Pixel 4a (5G) supports 60 fps. They have Google Camera 7.4 with software enhancements, including Live HDR+ with dual exposure controls, improved Night Sight with Astrophotography mode, and improved Portrait Mode with more realistic bokeh. Google also offers unlimited cloud photo storage at "high quality"; original resolution storage requires users to pay for Google One.

Software 
The Pixel 4a shipped with Android 10 and version 7.4 of the Google Camera app at launch, while the Pixel 4a (5G) shipped with Android 11 and version 8.0 of the Google Camera app at launch. Both are expected to receive 3 years of major OS upgrades with support extending until 2023, and have features such as Call Screen and a Personal Safety app.

Reception 
The Pixel 4a was released to generally positive reviews with many reviewers praising the camera quality and overall value for money. CNET's Lynn La gave the Pixel 4a a score of 8.4/10, considering it to have the best photo quality among phones in the same price range. Dieter Bohn of The Verge praised the phone for its excellent camera and acceptable battery life, but criticized the mediocre video recording performance and lack of wireless charging and water resistance. Brian Chen of The New York Times compared the Pixel 4a with the second-generation iPhone SE, remarking that the Pixel had superior low light photos, and a better display and battery life, but the iPhone had better performance. Samuel Gibbs of The Guardian stated that the phone operated smoothly and had better battery life than the Pixel 3a XL and the iPhone SE.

Known issues

Fixed issues 
 Some Pixel 4a (5G) users reported touchscreen problems. Google addressed this in a February 2021 security update.

References

External links 
 

Android (operating system) devices
Discontinued smartphones
Google hardware
Google Pixel
Mobile phones introduced in 2020
Mobile phones with 4K video recording
Mobile phones with multiple rear cameras